The Dallara GP3/13 was the second generation of car developed by Italian manufacturer Dallara to run as the sole chassis for the GP3 Series, a feeder series for Formula One and the GP2 Series. The GP3/13 made its debut at the start of the 2013 season in Barcelona and it was in use for three seasons before being replaced by the Dallara GP3/16.

The 280bhp turbo-charged inline-4 engine that was used in the Dallara GP3/10 between 2010 and 2012 was upgraded to a 400bhp 3.4 litre (207 cu in) naturally-aspirated V6 unit, with initial estimations suggesting that the chassis would be up to three seconds per lap faster than its predecessor, which proved to be accurate during pre-season testing at the Autódromo do Estoril.

References

External links

GP3 Series
Open wheel racing cars
GP3 13
GP3 Series cars